Cotriguaçu is a municipality in the state of Mato Grosso in the Central-West Region of Brazil.

The municipality contains part of the 19,582-square-kilometer (7,561-sq-mi) Juruena National Park, one of the largest conservation units in Brazil.
It contains 56% of the 227,817-hectare (562,950-acre) Igarapés do Juruena State Park, created in 2002.
The Igarapés do Juruena State Park overlaps by almost 53% with the Juruena National Park.

See also
List of municipalities in Mato Grosso

References

Sources

Municipalities in Mato Grosso